The Battle of Shanghai was the first of the twenty-two major engagements fought between the National Revolutionary Army (NRA) of the Republic of China (ROC) and the Imperial Japanese Army (IJA) of the Empire of Japan at the beginning of the Second Sino-Japanese War. It lasted from August 13, 1937, to November 26, 1937, and was one of the largest and bloodiest battles of the entire war, later described as "Stalingrad on the Yangtze", and is often regarded as the battle where World War II started. After over three months of extensive fighting on land, in the air and at sea, the battle concluded with a victory for Japan.

Since the Japanese invasion of Manchuria in 1931 followed by the Japanese attack of Shanghai in 1932, there had been ongoing armed conflicts between China and Japan without an official declaration of war. These conflicts finally escalated in July 1937, when the Marco Polo Bridge Incident triggered the full advance from Japan. Dogged Chinese resistance at Shanghai was aimed at stalling Japanese advance, giving much needed time for the Chinese government to move vital industries to the interior, while at the same time attempting to bring sympathetic Western powers to China's side. During the fierce three-month battle, Chinese and Japanese troops fought in downtown Shanghai, in the outlying towns, and on the beaches of the Yangtze River and Hangzhou Bay, where the Japanese had made amphibious landings.

Chinese forces were equipped primarily with small-caliber weapons against much greater Japanese air, naval, and armor power. In the end, Shanghai fell, and China lost a significant portion of its best troops, while failing to elicit any international intervention. However, the resistance of Chinese forces over three months of battle shocked the Japanese, who had been indoctrinated with notions of cultural and martial superiority, and largely demoralized the Imperial Japanese Army, who believed they could take Shanghai within days and China within months.

The battle can be divided into three stages, and eventually involved nearly one million troops. The first stage lasted from August 13 to August 22, 1937, during which the NRA attempted to eradicate Japanese troop presence in downtown Shanghai. The second stage lasted from August 23 to October 26, 1937, during which the Japanese launched amphibious landings on the Jiangsu coast and the two armies fought a Stalingrad-like house-to-house battle, with the Japanese attempting to gain control of the city and the surrounding regions. The last stage, ranging from October 27 to the end of November 1937, involved the retreat of the Chinese army in the face of Japanese flanking maneuvers, and the ensuing combat on the road to China's capital, Nanjing.

Prelude

Ōyama Incident 

On 9 August, Lieutenant  of the Japanese Special Naval Landing Forces came speeding in a car up to the gate of Hongqiao Airport. As he was stopped by a Chinese guard, the lieutenant attempted to drive past the gate. The guard stopped him again and Ōyama shot and killed the guard. Other Chinese guards returned fire, and Ōyama was killed in the shootout.

Access to Hongqiao Airport was a violation of the terms agreed by China and Japan under the terms of the ceasefire signed in 1932. It is still unknown whether Ōyama attempted to enter the military airport. The incident heightened the tensions between the Chinese and Japanese forces in Shanghai. On 10 August, the Japanese Consul General demanded that the Chinese withdraw the Peace Preservation Corps and dismantle their defense works around the city. He also made it clear that the Imperial Japanese Army regarded the shooting of a Japanese officer as humiliating, and that any further incident would escalate the situation. In response to the incident, the Japanese began sending in reinforcements to Shanghai. Facing the increasing Japanese military presence in Shanghai, Chinese troops were also being deployed to the Shanghai area beginning on 11 August.

Final efforts at negotiation 

On 12 August, representatives from the United Kingdom, France, United States and Italy along with Japan and China participated in the joint conference held in Shanghai to discuss the ceasefire terms. Japan demanded the withdrawal of Chinese troops from Shanghai, while the Chinese representative Yu Hung-chun dismissed the Japanese demand, stating that the terms of ceasefire have already been violated by Japan. The major powers did not wish to see another January 28 Incident, which greatly disrupted foreign economic activities in Shanghai. On the other hand, Chinese citizens feverishly welcomed the presence of Chinese troops in the city. In Nanjing, Chinese and Japanese representatives met for the last time for final efforts at negotiation. The Japanese demanded that the Chinese withdraw all Peace Preservation Corps from Shanghai and all regular troops from the vicinities of the city. The Chinese insisted that the Japanese demand of a unilateral Chinese withdrawal was unacceptable since the two countries were already fighting a war in North China. At last Mayor Yu made it clear that at most the Chinese government would concede that the Chinese troops would not fire unless fired upon. Japan on the other hand placed all responsibility on China because of Chinese deployment of troops around Shanghai. Negotiation was impossible and there was no alternative other than the spread of war into Central China.

Order of battle

First phase (13 August – 22 August)

Urban fighting 

Around 9 am on August 13, the Chinese Peace Preservation Corps exchanged small arms fire with Japanese troops in the Zhabei, Wusong, and Jiangwan districts of Shanghai. At about 3 pm the Japanese army crossed over the Bazi Bridge (八字橋) in Zhabei and attacked various centers in the city. The 88th Division retaliated with mortar attacks. Sporadic shooting continued through the day until 4 pm, when Japanese headquarters ordered ships of the Third Fleet stationed in the Yangtze and the Huangpu River to open fire on Chinese positions in the city. Late that night, Chiang Kai-shek ordered Zhang Zhizhong to begin Chinese offensive operations the next day. The next morning the Republic of China Air Force (ROCAF) began bombing various Japanese targets and Chinese ground forces attacked at 3 pm. On the same day, August 14, the Chinese government issued the Proclamation of Self-Defense and War of Resistance (自衛抗戰聲明書), explaining the government's resolution against Japanese aggression. The Battle of Shanghai had officially begun.

Zhang Zhizhong's initial plan was to have the numerically superior Chinese forces attack the Japanese by surprise and push them into the Huangpu River, then blockade the coast to deny the Japanese the opportunity to land reinforcements at the Huangpu wharves between Yangshupu and Hongkou. The 88th Division was to attack Japanese army headquarters near Zhabei, and the 87th Division was to attack the reinforced Kung-ta Textile Mill, where the Japanese naval command was located. Zhang estimated it would take one week to achieve these objectives; however, the operation ran into trouble when his troops were fought to a standstill just outside the Shanghai International Settlement. Japanese strongholds were fortified with thick concrete and were resistant to 150mm howitzers, the only heavy weapons the Chinese possessed. Chinese troops could only advance, under the cover of machine gun fire, by getting close enough to the emplacements to kill those within with hand grenades. The Chinese advance was greatly slowed and the element of surprise was lost.

Lacking the heavy weapons to destroy the Japanese bunkers directly, Zhang Zhizhong decided to encircle them instead. On August 16, he ordered his men to take the streets surrounding the Japanese strongholds. Every time a street was successfully cleared, the Chinese would set up a sandbag blockade, gradually surrounding each stronghold and closing off all possible routes of escape. The tactic was successful at first and the Chinese were able to destroy many emplacements and outposts in a single day. However, the Japanese then deployed tanks in the broad streets, enabling them to easily repel Chinese attacks and defeat the encircling strategy. On August 18 the Chinese attack was called off.

On August 18, Chen Cheng reached the front lines to discuss the situation with Zhang Zhizhong. They decided to send the newly arrived 36th Division into the fray, attacking the Hueishan (匯山) docks on the northern side of the Huangpu River. Meanwhile, the 87th Division broke through Japanese lines at Yangshupu, and pushed onto the Hueishan docks along with the 36th Division. On August 22, the tanks of the 36th Division reached the docks, but were unable to hold the position for long. The Chinese troops were insufficiently trained in coordinating infantry-tank tactics, and the troops were unable to keep up with the tanks. Without sufficient infantry to protect them, the tanks were vulnerable to Japanese anti-tank weapons and artillery in close quarters and became useless when they entered the city center. The few troops who did manage to keep up with the tanks through the city blocks were then trapped by Japanese blockades and annihilated by flamethrowers and intense machine gun fire. While the Chinese almost succeeded in pushing the Japanese down the Huangpu River, the casualty rate was exceedingly high. During the night of August 22 alone, the 36th Division lost more than ninety officers and a thousand troops. 36th staff officer Xiong Xinmin saw a Chinese suicide bomber stop a Japanese tank column by exploding himself beneath the lead tank.

On August 22, the Japanese 3rd, 8th, and 11th Divisions made an amphibious assault under the cover of naval bombardment and proceeded to land in Chuanshakou (川沙口), Shizilin (獅子林), and Baoshan (寶山), towns on the northeast coast some fifty kilometers (31 miles) away from downtown Shanghai. Japanese landings in northeast Shanghai suburban areas meant that many Chinese troops, who were deployed in Shanghai's urban center, had to be redeployed to the coastal regions to counter the landings. Thus, the front line was lengthened from metropolitan Shanghai along the Huangpu River to the northeast coastal districts. The Chinese offensive in the urban center had ground to a halt, and the fighting in downtown Shanghai essentially became a stalemate with both sides suffering heavy losses and making minimal changes in the front line. The Chinese divisions were able to hold on to Zhabei, Jiangwan, and other downtown positions for three months, until situations in other areas made it strategically impossible to continue defending them.

Air operations 

The frontline fighter aircraft of the Chinese Air Force at the beginning of full-scale hostilities consisted primarily of Curtiss Hawk IIs and Hawk IIIs (many license-built at the CAMCO plant at the Jianqiao Airbase) and the Boeing P-26 Model 281 Peashooter. The Chinese pilots in particular used the Hawk IIIs in various multi-role combat operations against Imperial Japanese positions in and around Shanghai, while the P-26 primarily provided escort cover.

On August 14, the ROCAF bombed the Japanese Navy flagship Izumo. In what became known as "Black Saturday", bombs from ROCAF aircraft fell in the Shanghai International Settlement. While the Chinese pilots were instructed not to fly over the Shanghai International Settlement, the Japanese flagship was berthed right in front of it in what may amount to using the civilian enclave as a human shield; 700-950 Chinese and foreign civilians were killed outright, with a total of 3,000 of civilian deaths and injuries resulting from the accidental release of the bombs, with most of the death occurring at the Great World entertainment centre, where civilian refugees had gathered after fleeing from the fighting. The bombing was not an intended attack on the International Settlement: the four errant bombs were intended for the Japanese cruiser Izumo, which was moored nearby in the Whangpoo (Huangpu) river, adjacent to the Bund. Two exploded in Nanking Road and two in front of the Great World Amusement Centre on Avenue Edward VII, killing an estimated 2,000 shoppers and passers-by. Japanese planes responded to the attack on Izumo and the 4th Flying Group of the ROCAF, based in Henan, under the command of Captain Gao Zhihang (高志航), shot down six Japanese planes, while suffering zero losses. (In 1940 the government announced August 14 would be Air Force Day to raise the morale of the Chinese populace.) From August 15 to 18, the Chinese fought the numerically superior Japanese air force in intense air battles that saw two Japanese squadrons destroyed. China was fighting the air war with every airplane in its possession, some of them purchased second-hand from various countries. It was not able to produce any planes of its own to replace those lost in combat and was always running low on replacement parts and supplies. Japan, in contrast, had a robust aviation industry able to design and manufacture technologically advanced planes and could easily make good their losses. Thus, it was impossible for China to sustain an air war with Japan, however, the Chinese Air Force were given a much-needed lifeline with many new replacement fighter aircraft under the new Sino-Soviet Treaty as the initial inventory of American-made aircraft were gradually lost through attrition. In the Shanghai campaign, the ROCAF is said to have shot down 85 Japanese airplanes and sunk 51 ships, while losing 91 of its own airplanes, just under half of its entire air force at the time.

Other developments 

On August 15, the Japanese formed the Shanghai Expeditionary Army (SEF), composed of the 3rd and 11th Divisions, under the command of General Iwane Matsui. On August 19, Japanese Prime Minister Fumimaro Konoe announced that the Sino-Japanese conflict could only be resolved through war, regardless of any attempts at negotiation by third party nations. Konoe said that the initial plan of localized "containment" around the Shanghai region had now escalated to total war, with the ultimate goal of forcing the Chinese government to fully cooperate with the economic and political demands of Japan. On August 23, the Japanese began the bombing campaign over Nanjing, and various cities in Central China. The Shanghai Expeditionary Army also arrived on the same day.

At the beginning of the battle, Zhang Zhizhong, as the commander of the 5th Army and the Nanjing-Shanghai war zone, was responsible for conducting Chinese operations. The failure of the initial Chinese offensive greatly dismayed Chiang Kai-shek and his staff. Chiang criticized Zhang's failure to make sufficient preparations, especially the procurement of weapons capable of penetrating Japanese bunkers, before sending the troops in massive waves, which resulted in unsustainable casualties in many divisions right from the start. Zhang was also criticized for his overconfidence and his penchant for holding press conferences for both foreign and Chinese reporters in the cosmopolitan city. Chiang Kai-shek and his staff, the most prominent including Chen Cheng and Gu Zhutong, began taking over command duties from Zhang. Chiang Kai-shek himself would eventually become the commander of the third war zone which covers the entirety of Shanghai. Regardless, the Chinese offensives against the Japanese garrison failed despite outnumbering the Japanese troops, due to the lack of heavy weaponry and artillery support.

Second phase (23 August – 26 October) 

As the Chinese forces began to withdraw from the Shanghai area, more Japanese troops began to land near Shanghai, inflicting heavy casualties on the Chinese side. The fighting spread across from Shanghai metropolis all the way to the township of Liuhe, near the coast where the majority of the Japanese landings occurred.

The perceived strength of the Chinese response resulted in major reinforcement for Japanese units. The 9th, 13th, and 101st Divisions, the 5th Heavy Artillery Brigade, and a brigade-strength mixture of smaller units were ordered from Japan to Shanghai by Imperial General Headquarters on 11 September 1937.

Japanese landing (23 August – 10 September) 

On August 23, the SEF, led by Iwane Matsui, landed in Liuhe, Wusong (吳淞), and Chuanshakou. Chiang Kai-shek had expected these coastal towns to be vulnerable to Japanese landings and ordered Chen Cheng to reinforce the area with the 18th Army. However, the Chinese were no match for Japanese firepower. The Japanese almost always began their amphibious assaults with heavy naval and air bombardment of the Chinese coastal defense works and trenches. It was not unheard of for the Chinese to lose an entire garrison to such bombardments. However, the Chinese would reinforce almost immediately to counter the Japanese troops who had just made their landing after the bombardment.

In the two weeks that followed, the Chinese and Japanese troops fought bitter battles in the numerous towns and villages along the coast. The Chinese troops fending off the amphibious assaults had only their small-caliber weapons to depend on, and were not sufficiently supported by the ROCAF and the almost nonexistent Chinese navy. They paid heavily for the defense. An entire regiment could be reduced to just a few men in action. In addition, Chinese coastal defense works were hastily constructed and did not offer much protection against enemy attacks, as many trenches were newly constructed during lulls in fighting. Moreover, the sandy soil of the coastal region meant that it was difficult to construct sturdy fortifications. Many trenches would collapse due to rain. The Chinese raced against time to construct and repair these defense works despite constant Japanese bombardment. Logistics difficulty also meant it was hard to transport the necessary construction materials to the front line. The Chinese often had to turn to bombed-out houses to obtain bricks, beams, and other such materials. However, the Chinese fought against great odds and tried to hold on to the coastal villages as long as they could. It was commonplace for the Japanese to successfully occupy the towns in the day under heavy naval support, only to lose them during the night to Chinese counterattacks.

Such attacks and counterattacks continued well into late August, when the fall of Baoshan, a vital coastal town, seemed imminent. Chiang Kai-shek ordered the remaining troops of the 98th Division to defend the town. One battalion, under Yao Ziqing (姚子青), was assigned to the task. The situation in Baoshan was grim, as the Japanese had surrounded the town on September 5. However, Yao ordered his men to defend to the death. Japanese artillery strikes reduced the town to rubble, and Yao was killed in house-to-house fighting. On September 6 Baoshan fell. The entire battalion, except for one soldier, was killed in action. The Chinese would continue to sustain this level of casualties throughout the Shanghai campaign.

Combat around Luodian (11 September – 30 September) 

On September 11, with the fall of Baoshan, the Chinese Army moved into defensive positions around the small town of Luodian (羅店), the transportation center connecting Baoshan, downtown Shanghai, Jiading, Songjiang and several other towns with highways. The successful defense of Luodian was strategically paramount to the security of Suzhou and Shanghai; as early as August 29, German adviser Alexander von Falkenhausen had told Chiang Kai-shek that the town must be held at all costs. The Chinese concentrated some 300,000 soldiers there, while the Japanese amassed more than 100,000 troops, supported by naval gunfire, tanks, and aircraft.

The carnage and intensity of the resulting battle earned the fight for Luodian the nickname "grinding mill of flesh and blood" (血肉磨坊). Japanese assaults typically began at daybreak with concentrated aerial bombing, followed by the release of observation balloons to pinpoint the exact location of remaining Chinese positions for artillery and naval strikes. Japanese infantry would then advance under smoke screens, with armored support. Japanese planes would also accompany the infantry and strafe Chinese reinforcements.

Chinese defense was stubborn even in the face of overwhelming firepower. During the night, Chinese soldiers mined the roads connecting the coastal towns to Luodian and engaged in night combat to cut off Japanese advance troops. At daybreak, the Chinese would garrison the foremost defensive lines with comparatively few troops in order to reduce casualties resulting from intense Japanese bombardments. The Chinese would then emerge from rear positions to engage the enemy when the Japanese land offensive started after naval and artillery strikes had ceased.

Despite their numerical superiority, the defense of Luodian would prove impossible for the Chinese. The Japanese superiority of firepower forced the Chinese into a passive position, from which they could not mount counter-attacks until the Japanese were practically on top of them. Because of this, the decision was made to defend the entire town to the death, a tactic which greatly accelerated the attrition rate within the Chinese ranks. The casualty rate of General Chen Cheng's army group was more than fifty percent. By the end of September, the Chinese had been almost bled dry and were forced to give up Luodian.

Battle for Dachang (1 October – 26 October) 

On October 1, on advice from his commanders, Japanese Prime Minister Fumimaro Konoe decided to integrate the North China and Central China Theaters and launch an October offensive to subjugate the Chinese government and end the war. By this time, the Japanese had increased troop strength in the Shanghai region to more than two hundred thousand. Japanese troops also invaded the town of Liuhang (劉行), south of Luodian. Thus, the frontline moved further south onto the banks of the Wenzaobang River. The Japanese aim was to cross the Yunzaobang and take the town of Dachang (大場), which was the communications link between Chinese troops in downtown Shanghai and the northwest outlying towns.

If Dachang fell, Chinese troops would have to give up their positions in downtown Shanghai and regions east of the Huangpu River to avoid encirclement by the Japanese. The defense of Dachang was vital to how long the Chinese army could continue fighting in the Shanghai war zone; for this, Chiang Kai-shek mobilized whatever remaining troops he could find.

The two armies engaged in seesaw battles, with little changes in the frontline along the Yunzaobin River. From September 11 to October 20, the Japanese army was able to advance only five kilometers. At the most intense moments, positions would change hands five times a day. On October 17, the Guangxi Army under Li Zongren and Bai Chongxi finally arrived to join Chiang Kai-shek's Central Army in the battle for Shanghai. The Chinese then staged a final counteroffensive in an attempt to fully consolidate Chinese positions around Dachang and retake the banks of the Yunzaobin River. However, the counteroffensive was poorly coordinated and again the Chinese succumbed to superior Japanese firepower. The Japanese utilized some 700 artillery pieces and 150 bombers for the Dachang operation and the town was totally reduced to rubble. The fighting was so fierce that the Chinese casualty rate per hour was sometimes in the thousands, and some divisions were incapacitated in a matter of just a few days. The fighting continued until October 25, when Dachang finally fell. By then, Chinese troops had no option but to withdraw from downtown Shanghai, which they had held for almost three months.

Third Phase (27 October – 26 November)

Chinese withdrawal from Shanghai city 

Starting the night of October 26, the Chinese began withdrawing from Shanghai's urban center. Because Dachang and other vital suburban towns had been lost already, Chiang Kai-shek ordered the Chinese troops to retreat from Zhabei, Jiangwan (江灣), and other positions that the troops had held for seventy-five days without faltering. However, Chiang ordered one battalion of the 88th Division remain in Zhabei to defend the Sihang Warehouse on the northern bank of the Suzhou Creek.

Chiang wanted the Chinese military presence to remain in Shanghai as long as possible to have a positive reflection on the ongoing Nine-Power Treaty conference that was in session in Brussels, with the hopes for possible intervention from Western powers. The rest of the Chinese troops crossed the Suzhou Creek and regrouped to engage the Japanese troops.

Fighting around Suzhou Creek 

Chiang's original plan was to fight in areas south of the Suzhou Creek and inflict as many Japanese casualties as possible. However, through three months of intense fighting, Chinese troop strength had been greatly reduced. Most units had their strength halved, and as a result a division had the fighting capability of less than two regiments. By now, the Chinese army needed between eight and twelve divisions to match the fighting strength of just one Japanese division. Thus, Chinese commanders were pessimistic about the outcome of the Suzhou Creek combat.

Li Zongren, Bai Chongxi, Zhang Fakui and other commanders insisted that the Chinese troops should enter the Wufu and Xicheng defense lines to protect Nanjing, but Chiang wanted the Chinese troops to continue fighting on the southern bank of Suzhou Creek. On October 28, Chiang arrived in the battlefield to boost the morale of his troops. However, the situation was bleak. On October 30, the Japanese crossed Suzhou River and the Chinese troops were in danger of encirclement. The Chinese army was at its limit of endurance.

Japanese landings at Jinshanwei 

As early as October 12, the Japanese chiefs of staff had already formulated plans to force a landing in Jinshanwei (金山衛), a town located on the northern bank of Hangzhou Bay, south of the Shanghai region. The Jinshanwei landings would facilitate a northward push into Shanghai, to complement the landings in northeastern towns, such as the ones around Baoshan between late August and mid-September, which brought about a southward push.

Chiang Kai-shek was aware of the Japanese plan to encircle his army in Shanghai from the north and the south, and had already ordered his commanders to take precautions of the possible Japanese landings at Jinshanwei. However, the impending fall of Dachang in late October forced Chiang to redeploy the Chinese divisions originally stationed along the northern coast of Hangzhou Bay.

As a result, the lack of Chinese defenses allowed the Japanese 10th Army Corps, composed of units diverted from the Battle of Taiyuan in the North China Theater, to land easily in Jinshanwei on November 5. Jinshanwei was only forty kilometers away from the banks of Suzhou River where the Chinese troops had just retreated from the fall of Dachang.

Road to Nanjing

Decision to take Nanjing 

In October, the SEF was reinforced by the Japanese 10th Army commanded by Lieutenant General Heisuke Yanagawa. On 7 November, Japanese Central China Area Army (CCAA) was organized by combining the SEF and the 10th Army, with Matsui appointed as its commander-in-chief concurrently with that of the SEF. After winning the battles around Shanghai, the SEF suggested the Imperial General Headquarters in Tokyo to attack Nanking.

The CCAA was rearranged and Lieutenant General Prince Asaka (Yasuhiko), an uncle of Emperor Hirohito, was appointed as the commander of the SEF, while Matsui stayed as the commander of CCAA overseeing both the SEF and the 10th Army. The real nature of Matsui's authority is however difficult to establish as he was confronted with a member of the imperial family directly appointed by the Emperor. In anticipation of the attack on Nanking, Matsui issued orders to his armies that read:

Nanjing is the capital of China and the capture thereof is an international affair; therefore, careful study should be made so as to exhibit the honor and glory of Japan and augment the trust of the Chinese people, and that the battle in the vicinity of Shanghai is aimed at the subjugation of the Chinese Army, therefore protect and patronize Chinese officials and people, as far as possible; the Army should always bear in mind not to involve foreign residents and armies in trouble and maintain close liaison with foreign authorities in order to avoid misunderstandings.

On December 2, Emperor Showa nominated one of his uncles, Prince Asaka, as commander of the invasion. It is difficult to establish if, as a member of the imperial family, Asaka had a superior status to general Iwane Matsui, who was officially the commander in chief, but it is clear that, as the top-ranking officer, he had authority over division commanders, lieutenant-generals Kesago Nakajima and Heisuke Yanagawa.

Japanese advance toward Nanjing 
After securing control of Shanghai, the Japanese army began its advance towards Nanjing on November 11, 1937, approaching the city from different directions.

The Japanese advance to Nanjing can be characterized as a "forced march". Almost all units covered the distance of almost 400 kilometers in about a month. Assuming that capture of the Chinese capital would be the decisive turning point in the war, there was an eagerness to be among the first to claim the honor of victory.

The Japanese army was engaged by Chinese soldiers on a number of occasions on the way to Nanjing. As a general rule, they were heavily outnumbered. As the Japanese came closer to Nanjing, the fighting grew in both frequency and severity.

Chinese retreat from Shanghai 

Japanese landings at Jinshanwei meant that the Chinese army had to retire from the Shanghai front and attempt a breakout. However, Chiang Kai-shek still placed some hope that the Nine-Power Treaty would result in a sanction against Japan by Western powers. It was not until November 8 that the Chinese central command issued a general retreat to withdraw from the entire Shanghai front. All Chinese units were ordered to move toward western towns such as Kunshan, and then from there enter the final defense lines to stop the Japanese from reaching Nanjing.

By then, the Chinese army was utterly exhausted, and with a severe shortage of ammunition and supplies, the defense was faltering. Kunshan was lost in only two days, and the remaining troops began moving toward the Wufu Line fortifications on November 13. The Chinese army was fighting with the last of its strength and the frontline was on the verge of collapse.

In the chaos that ensued many Chinese units were broken up and lost contact with their communications officers who had the maps and layouts to the fortifications. In addition, once they arrived at Wufu Line, the Chinese troops discovered that some of the civilian officials were not there to receive them as they had already fled and had taken the keys with them. The battered Chinese troops, who had just emerged from the bloodbath in Shanghai and were hoping to enter the defense lines, found that they were not able to utilize these fortifications.

The Wufu Line was penetrated on November 19, and the Chinese troops then moved toward Xicheng Line, which they were forced to give up on November 26 in the midst of the onslaught. The "Chinese Hindenburg Line", which the government had spent millions to construct and was the final line of defense between Shanghai and Nanjing, collapsed in only two weeks. The Battle of Shanghai was over. However, fighting continued without a pause on the road to China's capital and the ensuing combat immediately led into the Battle of Nanjing.

By early December, Japanese troops had reached the outskirts of Nanking.

Aftermath

Loss of Central Army military strength 

Even though the Battle of Shanghai was only the first of the twenty-two major battles fought between China and Japan, Chiang Kai-shek's decision to send his best troops into the battle had significant repercussions. At the outbreak of the war, the Chinese NRA boasted a standing army of some 1.75 million troops, but the combat strength was significantly lower as the majority of the Chinese troops were poorly trained and poorly equipped.  Only about 300,000 were comparatively better trained. These troops were reorganized into some 20 newly formed divisions. Of these, around 80,000 had belonged to the German-trained divisions that composed the elite units of Chiang Kai-shek's Central Army. However, even these divisions were not sufficiently supported by combined arms. Thus, out of a grand total of almost two million men-in-arms, less than one hundred thousand Chinese troops were able to fight Japan on more or less equal terms.

Chiang Kai-shek's decision to commit his elite divisions to fight in Shanghai caused his elite units to suffer some sixty percent casualties in the three-month bloodbath. In one single blow, Chiang also lost some 10,000 of the 25,000 junior officers trained by the Whampoa Military Academy between 1929 and 1937, in addition to some tens of thousands of potential military officers. Chiang Kai-shek's Central Army was never to recover from these devastating losses. By the time the 88th Division, arguably the best of these elite divisions, began its defense of Nanjing, it had been reduced to seven thousand men, of whom three thousand were new recruits to replace the losses.

Losses to the Nationalist army's very small stock of armor were also significant. The Chinese deployed three tank battalions in the battle and its immediate aftermath. The 1st Battalion had 32 VCL Amphibious Tanks and some 6-ton Vickers Mark E tanks. The 2nd Battalion also in Shanghai had 20 Vickers Mark E tanks, 4 VCL Tanks and Carden Loyd tankettes. The 3rd Battalion had 10 Panzer I light tanks, 20 CV35 tankettes, and some Leichter Panzerspähwagen armored cars. Almost all of these were lost during the battles in Shanghai and later on in Nanjing.

The heavy casualties inflicted on Chiang's own military strength forced him to rely more on non-Whampoa generals, who commanded the provincial armies and many of whom had questionable loyalty to Chiang. Because of the reduction in his military power, Chiang lost some of his political leverage over local warlords. In effect, Chiang Kai-shek was effectively only the head of a loose coalition, rather than the commander-in-chief of a united fighting force. The sapping of China's best fighting men also made the planning and execution of subsequent military operations difficult. In essence, Chiang Kai-shek's concerted pre-war effort to build a truly effective, modernized, national army was greatly devastated by the sacrifices made in the Battle of Shanghai.

International response 

A major reason that the Chinese army held onto the city as long as it did, even though it was on the brink of collapse, was that China was hoping for Western intervention in the Sino-Japanese War. Western nations had been paying little attention to China's plight since they were preoccupied with the situation in Europe. In addition, most Western nations had little prospect that their intervention would help China in the long run because they believed that China would eventually lose. If China was deemed militarily weak, economically backward, and politically disunited by Western powers, it would not make sense for them to help China when it seemed bound for defeat by Japan.

Thus, Chiang Kai-shek had to devote everything China had to offer to make sure the Western powers knew that the present conflict between China and Japan was a major war, not a collection of inconsequential "incidents" as had been the case previously. Based on this political strategy, Chiang Kai-shek had to order his troops to fight to the death in an attempt to arouse international sympathy and cause the international community to adopt measures that would help China and sanction Japan.

On September 12, one month after the Battle of Shanghai began, China formally brought the case against Japan to the League of Nations. Again, the League was not able to formulate any effective sanctions against Japan other than an October 4 statement that gave China "spiritual support". The United States was not a member of the League and Great Britain and France were reluctant to challenge Japan. Of all the major Western powers, only the United States seemed able to act more since it was not embroiled in the volatile European affairs.

In addition, on October 5, President Franklin D. Roosevelt gave the Quarantine Speech, calling for the United States to help nations fight against aggressor nations. This speech had a tremendous effect on raising China's morale. Because America seemed willing to confront Japan, the British representative suggested to close the League case and convene the Nine Power Treaty Conference. Since the Nine-Power Treaty was signed as a result of the Washington Naval Conference of 1922, the opening of the Conference automatically brought the United States into the effort to rein in Japanese aggression.

American entry into the international response brought new hope to the Chinese, and Chiang Kai-shek again reiterated the need for his troops to hold on to Shanghai to prove that China was indeed worth fighting for. By mid-October, the Chinese situation in Shanghai had become increasingly dire and the Japanese had made significant gains. The vital town of Dachang fell on October 26 and the Chinese withdrew from metropolitan Shanghai.

However, because the Nine Power Treaty Conference was to begin in early November, Chiang Kai-shek ordered his troops to stay in the Shanghai battlefield, instead of retreating to the Wufu and Xicheng Lines to protect Nanjing. He also left one lone battalion to defend the Sihang Warehouse in metropolitan Shanghai. Chiang also visited the frontlines to encourage his troops.

Because Shanghai was the most important Chinese city in Western eyes, the troops had to fight and hold on to the city as long as possible, rather than moving toward the defense lines along nameless towns en route to Nanjing. On November 3, the Conference finally convened in Brussels. While the Western powers were in session to mediate the situation, the Chinese troops were making their final stand in Shanghai and had all hopes for a Western intervention that would save China from collapse.

Nine-Power Treaty Conference

Effects 
In terms of its long-term effects on the war of attrition, the Battle of Shanghai bought enough time for the Chinese government to move some of its vital industries to Wuhan and Xi'an, and from there to Chongqing, China's wartime capital after the fall of Nanjing and Wuhan. The difficulty in dismantling and relocating thousands of tons of machinery and factory equipment, especially in the heat of Japanese bombing campaigns, meant that the Chinese government fell short of its goal of moving the entire industrial base from the Shanghai region.

Many factories were destroyed during the fighting and ceased to be functional. Of the nearly twelve hundred factories and workshops of all sizes, only slightly more than ten percent were moved out of Shanghai. However, as insignificant as they were, these factories formed the core of China's wartime industry, especially in the bleak days of the blockade of the entire Chinese coast, the closure of the Burma Road, and the low tonnage of supplies flown over the Hump.

Chiang Kai-shek's strategy of bringing the fight to Shanghai to force Japan to adopt an east-to-west direction of attack also prevented Japan from cutting right into Central China. As a result, the Battle of Wuhan was delayed for almost a year, and the time bought gave the Chinese government breathing space to recuperate and relocate more resources to Chongqing. Overall, even though Chinese losses were irreparable, the strategy of trading "space for time" proved its worth.

The Battle of Shanghai was a military defeat but a high point for Chinese nationalism. The beginning of full-scale war meant that China would no longer stand idly and allow Japan to conquer its territories piece by piece as it had done in the past. It also demonstrated China's resolve not to surrender even in the face of overwhelming firepower. However, Chiang Kai-shek's order to have his troops make one death stand after another greatly sapped his strength and directly caused his army's inability to defend Nanjing for even two weeks.

In his memoir, General Li Zongren pointed out that Chiang's staff had proposed that the Chinese army reserve around ten divisions along the Wufu Line to protect Nanjing and felt it made no difference if Shanghai could be held for a few months longer at the expense of huge casualties. However, as China was not able to defeat Japan single-handedly, Chiang believed the best option was to bring the western powers into the war by eliciting international sympathy being committed to the resistance in Shanghai.

In his correspondence with Hu Shih, Chiang wrote that China was capable of withstanding six months of combat before changes in the international situation would have to end the war. This may have also caused Chiang to devote all of his best troops in the first battle of what would eventually become a prolonged war. However, while Chiang's initial assessment was overly optimistic, China continued to fight for eight more years until Japan finally surrendered after the atomic bombs were dropped on Hiroshima and Nagasaki and the Soviet invasion of Manchuria.

See also 

 Events preceding World War II in Asia
 Jinan incident (May 1928)
 Huanggutun incident (Japanese assassination of the Chinese head of state Generalissimo Zhang Zuolin on 4 June 1928)
 Second Sino-Japanese War
 Japanese invasion of Manchuria
 Mukden Incident (18 September 1931)
 January 28 Incident (Shanghai, 1932)
 Defense of the Great Wall (1933)
 Marco Polo Bridge Incident (7 July 1937)
 Assassination of Tomomitsu Taminato (1936)
 Great Way Government (Shanghai, 1937–1938)
 Shanghai Ghetto
 Defense of Sihang Warehouse

References

Citations

Sources 

 
 
 
 
 
 
 
 * Van de Ven, Hans, "The Battle of Shanghai". Chapter five in

External links 

 "Japan-China: Sailors Ashore". Time. August 30, 1937.
  
  
National Archives (USA) film, "On the Japanese bombing and occupation of Shanghai". total run time = 10:20

Conflicts in 1937
1937 in China
1937 in Japan
Shanghai 1937
Battle of Shanghai
Invasions of China
Invasions by Japan
Urban warfare
Articles containing video clips
Military history of Shanghai